The Martinolich Shipbuilding Company was founded in the early 1900s by John Martinolich (1877-1960), an Italian immigrant from modern day Croatia.

Course of business
The company's original shipyard was at Dockton, Washington, but later expanded to other locations.  The company was active from 1904 to 1974 and built many vessels.

Among the earlier vessels built by the company were the wooden propeller steamers Vashon (1905), Verona (1910), Nisqually (later renamed Astorian) and Calista, both built in 1911, Florence J. (1914), F.G. Reeves, (1916), Vashona (later renamed Sightseer) (1921), and the ferry Whidby (1923).

San Francisco
In 1943 Martinolich San Francisco location built for the US army Self-Propelled Barge. Built were hull ID BSP-1046 to BSP-1055. These were wood a hull design, type	291, and had a length of 105 feet.

Notes

References

External links 
 List of vessels constructed by Martinolich Shipbuilding
 History of Martinolich Shipbuilding

Defunct shipping companies of the United States
Defunct manufacturing companies based in Washington (state)
Steamboats of Washington (state)
Maritime history of Washington (state)
Shipbuilding in Washington (state)